This is a partial list of newspapers in Bosnia and Herzegovina.

Daily newspapers

Weekly and biweekly newspapers

Sarajevo
BH Dani
Start BiH

Banja Luka
Novi reporter

Zenica
Naša riječ

Bijeljina
Semberske novine

Velika Kladuša
Reprezent

Tomislavgrad
Naša ognjišta

Tuzla
 Hrvatski glasnik

References

External links
 Press Council in Bosnia and Herzegovina official site

Bosnia
List
Newspapers